Ribes glandulosum, the skunk currant, is a North American species of flowering plant in the currant family. It is widespread in Canada (all 10 provinces and all 3 territories) and is also found in parts of the United States (Alaska, the Great Lakes region, the Appalachian Mountains, and the Northeast).

It has palmately lobed leaves with 5 or 7 deeply cut segments. Flowers are in elongated clusters of 6–15 pink flowers. Fruits are red and egg-shaped, sometimes palatable but sometimes not.

Conservation status in the United States
It is listed as endangered in Connecticut and New Jersey, and presumed extirpated in Ohio.

As a noxious weed
It is considered a noxious weed in Michigan, and planting it is prohibited in certain parts of the state.

Ethnobotany
The Ojibwa people take a compound decoction of the root for back pain and for "female weakness". The Woods Cree use a decoction of the stem, either by itself or mixed with wild red raspberry, to prevent clotting after birth, eat the berries as food, and use the stem to make a bitter tea. The Algonquin people use the berries as food.

References

glandulosum
Flora of Canada
Flora of the Northeastern United States
Flora of the Southeastern United States
Flora of Alaska
Flora of the Appalachian Mountains
Flora of the Great Lakes region (North America)
Fruits originating in North America
Plants used in Native American cuisine
Plants used in traditional Native American medicine
Plants described in 1784
Flora without expected TNC conservation status